Manuela may refer to:

People
 Manuela (given name), a Spanish and Portuguese feminine given name
 Manuela (singer) (1943–2001), German singer of Schlager songs

Film and television
 Manuela (1957 film), a British film directed by Guy Hamilton
 Manuela (1967 film), a Cuban short film directed by Humberto Solás
 Manuela (1976 film), a Spanish film directed by Gonzalo García Pelayo
 Manuela (2006 film), a film directed by Marco Castro
 Manuela (TV series), a 1991 telenovela starring Grecia Colmenares

Music
 "Manuela" (Demis Roussos song), 1974
 "Manuela", a song by Julio Iglesias from A flor de piel, 1974

ja:マヌエラ
pl:Manuela